Neighbourly relations exist between Austria and Hungary, two member states of the European Union. Both countries have a long common history since the ruling dynasty of Austria, the Habsburgs, inherited the Hungarian throne in the 16th century.  Both were part of the now-defunct Austro-Hungarian Empire from 1867 to 1918. The two countries established diplomatic relations in 1921, after their separation.

Both countries are full members of the European Union. They share a  border, which can be crossed anywhere without control, because of the Schengen Agreement.

History

Before World War II

In the last decades of the Dual Monarchy, Austria and Hungary developed side by side. In Hungary, by the Hungarian Nationalities Law (1868) the full equality of all citizens was reinstated along with first minority rights of Europe, though the Magyar aristocracy and bourgeoisie tried to "Magyarize" the ethnicities of the multi-national kingdom within forty years: this affected mainly the education, language and administration. In multi-national Austria, the Basic Law of the State of 1867 declared all nations of Imperial Austria equal, though the German influence remained relevant. In the Kingdom of Hungary, voting rights were kept to the upper classes, while in Austria universal, equal and direct voting of all men was established in 1907.

Before World War I, many aristocratic Hungarian families (such as Esterházy, Batthyany and Pálffy) had their own palaces in Vienna, where their king (who was also the Emperor of Austria) resided. Some of them still own these premises today.

Politicians and generals of both leading nations, Austrian Germans and Magyar Hungarians, were responsible for the disastrous foreign policy of the Monarchy that led towards World War I. Thence these two were treated as defeated enemies after World War I by the Allies of World War I. Both shared the experience of seeing millions of nationals having to live in other countries: the Austrians were not allowed to integrate the Germans of Bohemia and Moravia into their republic, the Hungarians had to leave the Magyars of Transylvania to Romania and those north of the Danube to Czechoslovakia (today Slovakia).

According to the Treaty of Versailles, 1919 and the Treaty of Trianon, 1920, Hungary had to cede its westernmost part, called , to Austria, since these districts were inhabited by Germans for centuries.  (now ) would have been the natural capital of the new Austrian State of Burgenland.  Hungary did not agree to relinquish this city, so the Allied powers ordered a referendum, which the Hungarians won. Although many Austrians considered the polls to be irregular, the decision was treated as definitive. The area called Burgenland by the Austrians was handed over to Austria in the autumn of 1921. Even today, Hungarian may be used as an official language in some communities of Burgenland. Hungarian aristocrats like the Esterházys and Batthyanys kept their vast estates in Austria, even after their Hungarian estates were expropriated in 1945.

Cold War era
Political development of Hungary and Czechoslovakia towards communist regimes after 1945 made Austrian politicians extremely cautious in their relations with the Communist Party of Austria, even though it did not get much support at the elections. The Iron Curtain made  Hungarians and Austrians living near the border feel the division of Europe quite personally.

During the Hungarian Revolution of 1956, Austrians hoped Imre Nagy, Pál Maléter and the thousands of revolutionaries would succeed. When the Red Army intervened, the Austrian neutrality policy, adopted in 1955, did not stop the government deploying the army (Bundesheer) at the eastern border with the order to shoot any foreign soldier entering Austria. Tens of thousands of Hungarian refugees found their way into Austria by the bridge at Andau and other ways. (In 1957, U.S. writer James Michener published his novel The Bridge at Andau.) The refugees were received in Austria with great sympathy.

The most prominent refugee was Archbishop Cardinal József Mindszenty, the Primate of Hungary. Liberated from imprisonment during the revolution, he lived at the American Embassy in Budapest until 1971, when he agreed to leave Hungary. He then travelled to Vienna under U.S. protection and lived at the "Pazmaneum", a seminary for Hungarian priests, until his death in 1975. In 1991 his remains were reburied at the cathedral in Esztergom in Hungary.

Another refugee of 1956 was Prince Pál Esterházy. Expropriated in Hungary, he lived from his vast estate in Burgenland (which as of 2013 belongs to his widow Melinda Esterhazy). But as Burgenland seemed too close to Communist Hungary for him, he preferred to reside in Zurich with his wife.

During the 1970s, Hungary under János Kádár curbed the oppressive state control and implemented a new policy called "Goulash Communism". Bruno Kreisky was then head of government in Austria, and official relations between Hungary and Austria thawed. Commentators, referring to the names of the two politicians, spoke of a new "K & K era". In the 1980s, both countries discussed plans were to hold a joint world exhibition ("Expo 1996") in Vienna and Budapest; a negative referendum on the issue, held in Vienna, killed the plan.

In 1989 the Hungarian government decided to tear down the Iron Curtain at the border with Austria, and on 27 June 1989 they staged a "tear-down action" together with Austria, at which foreign ministers Alois Mock and Gyula Horn cut through barbed wire with pliers in the presence of news photographers and reporters from around the world. The photographs, published worldwide, prompted many East Germans vacationing in Hungary to move to West Germany via Hungary and Austria immediately. Hungarian sources later commented that at the time of this photo opportunity most of the Iron Curtain had already been demolished.

Relations today
Both countries are members of the European Union, and since the end of 2007, the Schengen Agreement has allowed citizens to cross the border without control wherever there is a right of way. Austrian entrepreneurs have set up or bought banks, factories and shops in Hungary, vintners from Burgenland make wine in Hungary, and Austrian farmers have bought or leased Hungarian farmland.

Austrians living in the east of the country know that dentists in Hungary sometimes work much more cheaply than in Austria and visit dentists there, for example in Sopron and in Mosonmagyaróvár. Hungarian artisans are called to Austria for repair work and other household jobs.

In the mid 2000s, the gasoline company OMV, which is partly owned by the Austrian state, tried to obtain influence over the Hungarian gasoline company MOL Group by buying its shares, with the goal of merging the two companies. Hungarian public opinion and the Hungarian government were largely against this movement, and a law was passed to obstruct it. On 16 June 2008 the European Commission stated that because OMV was already the biggest player in the oil and gas markets in central Europe, a merger with MOL would seriously hamper competition in the region. In early 2009 OMV, seeing no chance to realize its plan, sold its MOL shares to a Russian energy company and announced to plan investments in other countries.

In 2009, both countries remembered the bicentenary of composer Joseph Haydn's death. Haydn, born in Lower Austria, died in Vienna, but had lived and worked for the Esterházy princes for 30 years in western Hungary, part of which is now the Austrian Burgenland.

Győr–Sopron–Ebenfurth Railway
This railway company with headquarters in Sopron is a joint enterprise of the states of Hungary (66.5%), Austria (28.6%) and a holding belonging to ÖBB Austrian Federal Railways (4.9%), which is due to sell its shares to the Strabag building company if the European Commission agrees. In Hungarian it is called  (GySEV), in German it was called  (ROeEE) until 2008 and is now called .

The company maintains the following railway lines:

 Győr/Raab–Sopron/Ödenburg–Ebenfurth (Lower Austria), the main line of the company
 Sopron/Ödenburg–Szombathely/Steinamanger (parallel to the Austrian border, in Hungary only; operated by MÁV, the Hungarian State Railway, until 2002)
 Szombathely/Steinamanger–Szentgotthárd/St. Gotthard (as above; operated by MÁV until 2006)
 Neusiedl am See (Burgenland)–Fertőszentmiklós (Hungary), 
 Széchenyi Museum Railway near Nagycenk/Groß-Zinkendorf (Hungary), a narrow-gauge track constructed in 1972

The main line of the company was licensed to a private company by the Hungarian government in 1872. The Györ−Sopron line opened to traffic around 1876. The "Neusiedler Seebahn" was opened in 1897. Traffic between the two countries continued even during the dissolution of Austria-Hungary, World War II, and the Cold War after it.

Beginning in the 1980s, the company got more business, especially in freight. A new freight terminal in Sopron was constructed. In 1987, the main line was electrified.

Resident diplomatic missions 
 Austria has an embassy in Budapest.
 Hungary has an embassy in Vienna and a consulate-general in Innsbruck.

See also 
 Foreign relations of Austria
 Foreign relations of Hungary
 Hungarians in Austria
 Andrássy Gyula German Language University of Budapest
 Accession of Hungary to the European Union

References

External links 
  Austrian Foreign Ministry: list of bilateral treaties with Hungary (in German only)
  Austrian embassy in Budapest (in German and Hungarian only)
  Hungarian embassy in Vienna (in German and Hungarian only)

 
Bilateral relations of Austria
Austria